Strangers in the City may refer to:
 Strangers in the City (2010 film), a Japanese thriller film
 Strangers in the City (1962 film), an American drama film